Mette Poulsen (born 14 June 1993) is a Danish badminton player. She was the girls' doubles gold medalist at the 2011 European Junior Championships, and the women's singles bronze medalist at the 2017 European Championships. Poulsen helped the national team win the European Women's Team Championships in 2014, 2016 and 2020.

Achievements

European Championships 
Women's singles

European Junior Championships 
Girls' doubles

BWF Grand Prix 
The BWF Grand Prix had two levels, the Grand Prix and Grand Prix Gold. It was a series of badminton tournaments sanctioned by the Badminton World Federation (BWF) and played between 2007 and 2017.

Women's singles

  BWF Grand Prix Gold tournament
  BWF Grand Prix tournament

BWF International Challenge/Series (5 titles, 5 runners-up) 
Women's singles

Women's doubles

Mixed doubles

  BWF International Challenge tournament
  BWF International Series tournament
  BWF Future Series tournament

References

External links 
 

1993 births
Living people
People from Næstved Municipality
Sportspeople from Region Zealand
Danish female badminton players
21st-century Danish women